The Creed Brothers are an American professional wrestling tag team consisting of brothers Brutus Creed (Drew Kasper; born May 13, 1996) and Julius Creed (Jacob Kasper; born October 3, 1994). They are currently working for the professional wrestling promotion WWE, where they perform on the NXT brand as part of the Diamond Mine stable.

Early lives and amateur wrestling 
The Kasper brothers were born in Lexington, Ohio. They attended Lexington High School, where they both competed in amateur wrestling.

Jacob Kasper attended Duke University in Durham, North Carolina, where he studied sociology, graduating in 2018. During his time at Duke University, he participated in collegiate wrestling for the Duke Blue Devils. He was a two-time National Collegiate Athletic Association (NCAA) All-American and a three-time NCAA Academic All-American, and won the 2018 Atlantic Coast Conference heavyweight championship. He set a Blue Devils record for the most wins in a single season and ranked second for overall career wins. He participated in the 2016 Olympic trials in the Greco-Roman and freestyle categories, placing fifth. In 2017, he trained with mixed martial artist Daniel Cormier to help Cormier prepare for his bout with Jon Jones at UFC 214. In 2018, he began working for Duke University as an assistant wrestling coach.

Drew Kasper attended Otterbein University in Westerville, Ohio, where he majored in exercise science, graduating in 2020. During his time at Otterbein University he competed in collegiate wrestling for the Otterbein Cardinals, with an overall record of 108–13. He was a two-time NCAA Division III All-American. In his final year, Kasper had a perfect 30–0 record and was ranked number one in the United States, but did not compete in the 2020 NCAA championships due to their cancellation as a result of the COVID-19 pandemic.

History
In October 2020, Jacob Kasper was signed by WWE after being scouted by Gerald Brisco at the 2018 NCAA Division I Wrestling Championships and attending a try-out that June. In February 2021, Drew Kasper was signed to a three-year contract by WWE after attending a try-out at his brother's urging. Both men were assigned to the WWE Performance Center in Orlando, Florida for training. In June 2021, Drew and Jacob Kasper were respectively renamed "Brutus Creed" and "Julius Creed". In August 2021, the Creed Brothers appeared on NXT as members of Roderick Strong's Diamond Mine stable, establishing themselves as villains in the process. They made their in-ring debut at the August 24, 2021, NXT tapings (with their match airing on September 7, 2021), defeating Chuckie Viola and Paxton Averill in a squash. 

On February 15, 2022, at NXT Vengeance Day, the Creed Brothers defeated MSK to win the Men's Dusty Rhodes Tag Team Classic. On June 4, 2022 at NXT In Your House they defeated Pretty Deadly to win the NXT Tag Team Championship. At Worlds Collide on September 4, 2022, the Creed Brothers lost the NXT Tag Team Championship to Pretty Deadly after Damon Kemp, a member of the Diamond Mine stable, turned on the Creed Brothers, costing them the match.

Professional wrestling style and persona 
The Creed Brothers wrestle in a power-based style incorporating "slams, suplexes and collisions". Their finishing moves include a clothesline/sliding lariat. Their style has drawn comparisons to both the Road Warriors and the Steiner Brothers. Reflecting their amateur wrestling backgrounds, the Creed Brothers perform wearing wrestling singlets and wrestling shoes. Brutus Creed was described by WWE in 2021 as possessing "a ruthless nature", while Julius Creed was described by WWE as possessing "uncontrollable aggression and an absolute sadistic nature".

Championships and accomplishments

Amateur wrestling 
Drew Kasper
NCAA All-American (2 times)
Jacob Kasper
ACC heavyweight championship (2018) 
NCAA All-American (2 times)
NCAA Academic All-American (3 times)
Southern Scuffle heavyweight division winner (2017, 2018)

Professional wrestling 
WWE
NXT Tag Team Championship (1 time)
Men's Dusty Rhodes Tag Team Classic (2022)

References

External links 
 
 
 
 
  
 
 

Living people
American male professional wrestlers
People from Lexington, Ohio
Professional wrestlers from Ohio
Sibling duos
WWE NXT teams and stables
Year of birth missing (living people)
NXT Tag Team Champions